327th may refer to:

327th Air Division, inactive air division of the United States Air Force
327th Aircraft Sustainment Wing, inactive wing of the United States Air Force last based at Tinker Air Force Base, Oklahoma
327th Squadron (disambiguation), several aviation units
327th Infantry Regiment (United States) ("Bastogne Bulldogs"), a glider-borne regiment of the U.S. 101st Airborne Division
327th Signal Battalion (United States) (Airborne) provided worldwide rapidly deployable signal support for the Joint Task Force Headquarters
327th Tank Battalion (United States), the mechanized unit that engaged in tank warfare in World War I for the United States

See also
327 (number)
327, the year 327 (CCCXXVII) of the Julian calendar
327 BC